Hugh "Hughie" Phillips (1864 – unknown) was an English footballer who played in the Football League for Stoke.

Career
Phillips was born in Lanark and played football with St Bernard's before joining Stoke in 1890. He stayed at Stoke for the 1890–91 season where he played seven in matches helping the club to win the Football Alliance title.

Career statistics

Honours
with Stoke
Football Alliance champions: 1890–91

References

Scottish footballers
Stoke City F.C. players
1864 births
Year of death missing
St Bernard's F.C. players
Association football wing halves
Sportspeople from Lanark
Football Alliance players
Footballers from South Lanarkshire